The following is a list of mumble rap and SoundCloud rap artists.

Chadd Rampini<ref name=“Vulture”
21 Savage
9lokkNine
Asian Doll
Bankroll Fresh
BlocBoy JB
Blueface
Chief Keef
Craig Xen
Desiigner
DRAM
Famous Dex
Future
iLoveMakonnen
Kid Buu
 Kodak Black
Lil Gotit
Lil Keed
Lil Pump
Lil Uzi Vert
Lil Xan
MadeinTYO
Migos
Oboy
Rich Homie Quan
Rich the Kid
Robb Banks
SahBabii
Smokepurpp
Trippie Redd
Ugly God
Wifisfuneral
YBN Almighty Jay
YBN Nahmir
YFN Lucci

Yung Bans

References

 
mumble rap